Angachamayam is a 1982 Indian Malayalam film, directed by Rajaji Babu and produced by Babu Jose. The film stars Prem Nazir, Swapna, Jose and T. R. Omana in the lead roles. The film has musical score by G. Devarajan.

Cast
Prem Nazir as Public Prosecutor Jayadevan
Swapna as Malla
Jose
T. R. Omana as Jayadevan's Mother
Prathapachandran as Tribal Leader
Sathaar as Baby
Anjali Naidu as Gayathri
Balan K. Nair as Robert
Jaffer Khan as Chandrahassan
Ravikumar as Forest Officer
 Kundara Johny as Sony
 Hari
 Paul Vengola
 Jaggu
 Aravindhakshan
 Vasu
 Rajashekaran
 Jayshree T.
 Baby Rajitha
 Preethi
 Saha
 Velayudhan
 Rama chandran
 Prem Shankar

Soundtrack
The music was composed by G. Devarajan and the lyrics were written by Mankombu Gopalakrishnan.

References

External links
 

1982 films
1980s Malayalam-language films